Oparić (Serbian Cyrillic: Опарић) is a village in Central Serbia, in the municipality of Rekovac (Region of Levač). The village has around 938 residents. The Oparić is well known as birthplace of native artist Janko Brašić.

External links 
 Levač Online
 Article about Oparić
 Pictures from Oparić
 Rekovac

References 

Populated places in Pomoravlje District
Šumadija